Jeff Fischer may refer to:

Jeff Fischer (baseball), former pitcher
Jeff Fischer (actor), American actor
Jeff Fischer (American Dad!), the character portrayed by the real Jeff Fischer

See also
Jeff Fisher (disambiguation)